Mohamed Lazhari-Yamani (born April 12, 1938) is a former Algerian gymnast who competed in the 1960 Summer Olympics in Rome for France and at the 1964 Summer Olympics in Tokyo, where he was Algeria's first ever Olympic athlete.

See also
 France at the 1960 Summer Olympics
 Algeria at the 1964 Summer Olympics

References

External links
 
 

1938 births
Gymnasts at the 1960 Summer Olympics
Gymnasts at the 1964 Summer Olympics
Living people
Sportspeople from Algiers
Algerian male artistic gymnasts
French male artistic gymnasts
Olympic gymnasts of Algeria
Olympic gymnasts of France
Algerian expatriates in France
21st-century Algerian people